Alberto Assirelli (31 August 1936 – 1 April 2017) was an Italian racing cyclist. He won stage 20 of the 1962 Giro d'Italia.

References

External links
 

1936 births
2017 deaths
Italian male cyclists
Italian Giro d'Italia stage winners
Place of birth missing